Abdul Halim  (6 December 1901 – 29 April 1966) was an Indian-Bengali politician, and communist activist. He was a member of the West Bengal Legislative Council from 1952 to 1966.

Background
Halim  was born in Burdwan district of Bengal Province in the British India.His father was Abul Hassan. Due to lack of funds, he was unable to complete his secondary education.

Political movement
In 1921, he joined Mahatma Gandhi's non-cooperation movement and was imprisoned. After his release, he made contact with Muzaffar Ahmad and Addur Rezzak Khan; and joined the Workers and Peasants Party. He was involved in the publication of Langal by Kazi Nazrul Islam and Ganabani by Muzaffar Amhad. When(1929-1936) Ahmad and others were imprisoned in the Meerut Conspiracy Case, he worked to organize the Communist Party. In 1933–34, he was influential in reshaping the CPI Central Committee.  In 1925, he co-founded the Labor Swaraj Party alongside Hemant Kumar Sarkar, writer Naresh Chandra Sengupta, and advocate Atul Gupta.  On the initiative of publishing communist literature, he founded 'Ganashakti Publishing House. He has been imprisoned several times for his involvement with the tram, the food movement, and his writing. From 1952 until his death on April 29, 1966, he was a member of the West Bengal Legislative Council .

Books 
He wrote some books on communism, including

 Tikasaha Communist Ishtahar (টীকা সহ কমিউনিস্ট ইশতেহার)
 Russiar Ganaandolan(রুশিয়ার গণ-আন্দোলন)
 Communism (কমিউনিজম)

References 

Communist Party of India (Marxist) politicians from West Bengal
1901 births
Bengali communists
1966 deaths
Members of the West Bengal Legislative Council